Zhitomirsky Uyezd (Житомирский уезд) was one of the subdivisions of the Volhynian Governorate of the Russian Empire. It was situated in the southeastern part of the governorate. Its administrative centre was Zhytomyr.

Demographics
At the time of the Russian Empire Census of 1897, Zhitomirsky Uyezd had a population of 433,859. Of these, 62.4% spoke Ukrainian, 14.3% Yiddish, 10.8% German, 5.9% Russian, 5.7% Polish, 0.6% Czech, 0.1% Bashkir and 0.1% Tatar as their native language.

References

 
Uezds of Volhynian Governorate
Volhynian Governorate